{
  "type": "ExternalData",
  "service": "page",
  "title": "West and East Jersey Dividing Lines.map"
}
The Thornton Line is a boundary line or partition line surveyed in 1696 through the Province of New Jersey during the colonial period, separating the territory into two proprietary colonies: the Province of East Jersey and the Province of West Jersey.  New Jersey was divided into two proprietary colonies after the Duke of York's 1664 grant of the colony to Sir George Carteret and John Berkeley, 1st Baron Berkeley of Stratton, and the sale of rights under the Quintipartite Deed in 1676.  The Thornton Line was an attempt to replace the errors of the Keith line (1686) and its amendment the Coxe–Barclay Line (1688) which was disowned by the East Jersey proprietors in 1695.  While it appears on Worlidge's map of the two Jersey colonies, it was never formally adopted.

See also
 Lawrence Line (1743)
 New York – New Jersey Line War

References

Pre-statehood history of New Jersey
History of the Thirteen Colonies
Borders of New Jersey
1696 establishments in New Jersey